Roberto Moré (born 11 February 1950) is a Cuban former pole vaulter who competed in the 1976 Summer Olympics.

References

1950 births
Living people
Cuban male pole vaulters
Olympic athletes of Cuba
Athletes (track and field) at the 1976 Summer Olympics
Pan American Games medalists in athletics (track and field)
Pan American Games bronze medalists for Cuba
Athletes (track and field) at the 1971 Pan American Games
Athletes (track and field) at the 1975 Pan American Games
Competitors at the 1974 Central American and Caribbean Games
Central American and Caribbean Games gold medalists for Cuba
Central American and Caribbean Games medalists in athletics
Medalists at the 1975 Pan American Games
21st-century Cuban people
20th-century Cuban people